Vicissitudes is an album by pianist Barry Harris recorded in 1972 and released on the German MPS label.

Track listing 
All compositions by Barry Harris except as indicated
 "Vicissitudes" - 4:15  
 "Now and Then" - 5:07 
 "Sweet Sewanee Blues" - 5:10  
 "Donna Lee" (Charlie Parker) - 5:50  
 "Renaissance" - 3:48
 "And So I Love You" - 4:11
 "With a Grain of Salt" - 3:19  
 "If I Loved You" (Oscar Hammerstein II, Richard Rodgers) - 4:47  
 "Shaw 'Nuff" (Dizzy Gillespie, Parker) - 3:05

Personnel 
Barry Harris - piano
George Duvivier - bass
Leroy Williams - drums

References 

Barry Harris albums
1975 albums
MPS Records albums
Albums produced by Don Schlitten